Lee Seung-Hyun (born July 25, 1985) is a South Korea football player who since 2016 has been playing for Suwon FC.

External links
 
 

1985 births
Living people
Association football midfielders
South Korean footballers
South Korea international footballers
Busan IPark players
Jeonbuk Hyundai Motors players
Gimcheon Sangmu FC players
Suwon FC players
K League 1 players
K League 2 players
Sportspeople from Daegu